John Francis Thomas Ryan (3 December 1914 – 31 July 1976) was an Australian rules footballer who played with Footscray and North Melbourne in the Victorian Football League (VFL).

Ryan came to Footscray from Maryborough and topped their goal-kicking in 1935, his debut season, with 25 goals. The following year he was selected to represent the VFL against the Victorian Football Association. He was a regular fixture in the Footscray side, as a wingman, for another three seasons before being traded to North Melbourne, in exchange for Ted Ellis, in 1940.

References

External links
 

1914 births
1976 deaths
Australian rules footballers from Victoria (Australia)
Western Bulldogs players
North Melbourne Football Club players
Maryborough Football Club players